CDK12 cyclin-dependent kinase 12 is a protein kinase that in humans is encoded by the CDK12 gene. This enzyme is a member of cyclin-dependent kinase protein family.

References

External links

Further reading

EC 2.7.11